Ornella Havyarimana (born 1 September 1994) is a Burundian boxer.

She took part in the 2020 Summer Olympics, held in 2021. She carried the flag for Burundi in the Parade of Nations at the opening ceremony, along with swimmer Belly-Cresus Ganira. Her forename appears as Omella in some sources.

She competed in the women's flyweight boxing competition at the 2020 Olympics.

References

1994 births
Living people
Boxers at the 2020 Summer Olympics
Olympic boxers of Burundi
Burundian women boxers
21st-century Burundian people